Xanthophorus is a genus of leaf beetles in the subfamily Eumolpinae. It is distributed in South Asia.

Species
 Xanthophorus andrewesi (Jacoby, 1903)
 Xanthophorus balyi (Jacoby, 1903)
 Xanthophorus carinatus Jacoby, 1908
 Xanthophorus flavopilosus (Jacoby, 1887)
 Xanthophorus fulvicollis Bryant, 1954
 Xanthophorus fuscipennis Jacoby, 1908
 Xanthophorus laevicollis Jacoby, 1908
 Xanthophorus lemoides (Walker, 1858)
 Xanthophorus montanus Jacoby, 1908
 Xanthophorus nepalicus Medvedev & Sprecher-Uebersax, 1999
 Xanthophorus nigricollis Jacoby, 1908
 Xanthophorus nigripennis (Jacoby, 1900)
 Xanthophorus pallidus (Jacoby, 1903)
 Xanthophorus seriatus Weise, 1922

References

Eumolpinae
Chrysomelidae genera
Beetles of Asia
Taxa named by Martin Jacoby